The Famous Teddy Z is an American sitcom that was broadcast on CBS during the fall of 1989. The series was created by Hugh Wilson and inspired by the true story of Jay Kantor, who was a mailroom clerk at MCA and later became Marlon Brando's agent.

Synopsis
The series starred Jon Cryer as Theodore "Teddy" Zakalokis, a young man working in a Hollywood talent agency in order to avoid being stuck in his Greek-American family's bakery. When Hollywood star Harland Keyvo (a caricature of Marlon Brando) meets Teddy Z, he is so impressed by his honesty that he makes him his new agent. The humor is derived from Teddy's innocent approach to the business, contrasted with the snake-like behavior of his fellow agents. The cast also included Jane Sibbett, Alex Rocco, Milton Selzer, Josh Blake, and Erica Yohn.

Cast
 Jon Cryer as Theodore "Teddy" Zakalokis
 Alex Rocco as Albert "Al" T. Floss
 Josh Blake as Aristotle "Ari" Zakalokis
 Tom LaGrua as Richard "Richie" Herby
 Milton Selzer as Abe Werkfinder
 Jane Sibbett as Laurie Parr
 Erica Yohn as Deena Zakalokis

Recurring
 Dennis Lipscomb as Harland Keyvo
 Jack Armstrong as Marty Horn 
 Barry Corbin as Zed Westhymer
 Tony Di Benedetto as Uncle Nikos
 Liz Torres as Aunt Angie

Production

Music
The theme song was written by Guy Moon and Stephanie and Steve Tyrell and performed by Bill Champlin.

Casting
When the series first went into production, Lainie Kazan was cast as Teddy's pushy mother, Deena Zakalokis. Kazan had appeared in the first six episodes and shot part of the seventh episode but was released from the series due to creative issues. Kazan reportedly sued the producers for $2 million over her dismissal. The role of Deena was promptly recast as Teddy's grandmother, with Erica Yohn being hired. Most of Kazan's scenes were reshot with Yohn before the show made its debut.

Murphy Brown crossover
Rocco's character, Al Floss, made a crossover appearance in the Murphy Brown season two episode "And the Whiner Is...", which originally aired on November 13, 1989. In the appearance Floss serves as an agent for several Murphy Brown characters.

Episodes

Reception
The series pilot was seen to be far stronger than subsequent episodes, but the series received two Primetime Emmy Award nominations, including one for the pilot, and for Alex Rocco, who won an Emmy as Best Supporting Actor in a Comedy Series, but low ratings led CBS to drop it with five episodes unaired.  It was later run in its entirety on Comedy Central in 1993 with episodes introduced by Rocco, and by Trio as part of its Brilliant But Cancelled series.

Awards and nominations

References

External links
 
 

CBS original programming
1989 American television series debuts
Television shows set in Los Angeles
1980s American sitcoms
1990s American sitcoms
1990 American television series endings
Primetime Emmy Award-winning television series
Television series by Sony Pictures Television
Television series created by Hugh Wilson
Television series about show business